The 2020–21 UNLV Runnin' Rebels basketball team represented the University of Nevada, Las Vegas during the 2020–21 NCAA Division I men's basketball season. The Runnin' Rebels were led by second-year head coach T. J. Otzelberger and played their home games at the Thomas & Mack Center in Paradise, Nevada as members of the Mountain West Conference.

Previous season
The Runnin' Rebels finished the 2019–20 season 17–15, 12–6 in Mountain West play to finish in a three-way tie for second place. They lost in the quarterfinals of the Mountain West tournament to Boise State.

Roster

Schedule and results

|-
!colspan=9 style=| Regular season

|-
!colspan=9 style=| Mountain West tournament

Source

References

UNLV
UNLV Runnin' Rebels basketball seasons
Run
Run